Verrier is both a surname and a given name. Notable people with the name include:

Sarah Verrier (born 2002), Australian rules footballer
Urbain Le Verrier (1811–1877), French mathematician
Verrier Elwin (1902–1964), British anthropologist, ethnologist, and tribal activist